Ernest Gal (born 19 July 1950) is a Romanian rower. He competed in the men's coxless four event at the 1976 Summer Olympics.

References

External links
 

1950 births
Living people
Romanian male rowers
Olympic rowers of Romania
Rowers at the 1976 Summer Olympics
People from Mureș County
World Rowing Championships medalists for Romania